Tertiary Highway 810, commonly referred to as Highway 810, is a provincially maintained access road, extending from Bull Lake to Richie Falls alongside the River aux Sables north of Massey. A northerly extension of Highway 553, the road was established in 1974 and has remained unchanged since then.

Route description 
A large portion of the route follows alongside the River aux Sables in River aux Sables Provincial Park.
There is relatively little human habitation along Highway810, owing to the extremely remote and rugged location.
At this point, Highway553 ends and Highway810 begins, travelling north through the Canadian Shield. As it snakes northward parallel with the River aux Sables, the route passes several resource access roads which travel even further into the wilderness.

While the Ministry of Transportation is charged with maintaining Highway810, the Public Transportation and Highway Improvement Act stipulates that this "does not include the clearing or removal of snow therefrom or the application of chemicals or abrasives to the icy surfaces thereof." Furthermore, the Ministry is "not liable for any damage sustained... using a tertiary road."
Traffic levels along the route are low, with approximately 50vehicles travelling it on an average day.

History 
The road that Highway810 follows was originally opened as the Massey Tote Road by the Spanish River Lumber Company at the turn of the 20thcentury, and provided access for loggers between Lake Huron and logging sites on the River aux Sables, which the road closely paralleled.
In early 1956, this road became Highway553 as far north as Whisky Lake Road.
A  northerly extension of Highway553 was designated as Highway810 on November20, 1974. Since then, the highway has remained unchanged.

Major intersections

References 

810
Roads in Algoma District